The Gosannen War (後三年合戦, gosannen kassen), also known as the Later Three-Year War, was fought in the late 1080s in Japan's Mutsu Province on the island of Honshū.

History
The Gosannen War was part of a long struggle for power within the warrior clans of the time.

The Gosannen kassen arose because of a series of quarrels within the Kiyohara clan (sometimes referred to as "Kiyowara").  The long-standing disturbances were intractable. When Minamoto no Yoshiie, who became Governor of Mutsu province in 1083, tried to calm the fighting which continued between Kiyohara no Masahira, Iehira, and Narihira.

Negotiations were not successful; and so Yoshiie used his own forces to stop the fighting.  He was helped by Fujiwara no Kiyohira.  In the end, Iehira and Narihira were killed.

During the siege of Kanezawa, 1086–1089, Yoshiie avoided an ambush by noticing a flock of birds take flight from a forest.

In art

Much of the war is depicted in an e-maki narrative handscroll, the Gosannen Kassen E-maki, which was created in 1171.   The artwork is owned today by the Watanabe Museum in Tottori city, Japan.

See also
 Kamakura Gongorō Kagemasa 
 Zenkunen War

References

Further reading
  Turnbull, Stephen. (1998). 'The Samurai Sourcebook'. London: Cassell & Co.

Wars involving Japan
1080s conflicts
1080s in Japan